At least two warships of Japan have borne the name Kirishima:

 , a battleship of the Imperial Japanese Navy, commissioned in 1915 and named after the volcano
 , a destroyer of the Japan Maritime Self-Defense Force commissioned in 1995

Japanese Navy ship names